Queen Gongwon of the Namyang Hong clan (25 August 1298 – 12 February 1380), more commonly known as Queen Mother Myeongdeok, was a Korean queen consort as the fourth wife of King Chungsuk of Goryeo and the mother of his two successors, Chunghye and Gongmin.

Biography

Early life and background
The future Queen Gongwon was born on 25 August 1298 as the fifth daughter of Hong Gyu from the Namyang Hong clan. Her mother was a woman from the Gwangju Gim clan. Lady Sunhwa, King Chungseon's 5th wife, was one of her older sisters.

Marriage and Palace life
In 1313, she married King Chungsuk at 16-years-old and promoted into Virtuous Consort Hong (덕비 홍씨, 德妃 洪氏), which her biological parents were given an Honorary Title of Internal Prince Namyang (남양부원군) and Grand Lady of Gwangju County (광주군대부인). She was rumored to be intelligent and tidy when she was young, but after entered the palace, she was said to follow the etiquette carefully and was loved and fond by the King.

In 1315, she gave birth into their first son, Wang Jeong. Although she was the King's first wife, Goryeo kings must married the Yuan Imperial members, so she had to go out and stay in Duke Jeongan's manor. But because the king loved her so much, he left the palace every night and lived in the Jeongan's manor, which due this, Yilianzhenbala, the Yuan Princess hated Hong badly, who had already become "Deok-Bi" at the time.

In 1318, Hong, the King and the Princess went to Yeongyeong Palace (연경궁, 延慶宮) to enjoy a banquet. At this time, when the King approached Hong, Yilianzhenbala felt jealous and fought with him as a result, which eventually escalated into a situation in which he beat her. However, she suddenly died a year later and subsequently, the other Princess, Jintong also died due to her childbirth. Thus, the relationship between the king and Hong deepened. Later, in 1330, she gave birth to their second son, Wang Gi.

Not long after this, the king abdicated the throne to Jeong and their relationship began crack little by little when he expelled to her hometown and banned her from meeting their son. In 1332, after two years reinstated, Chungsuk restored her and she then returned to Gaegyeong.

Two sons' reign
During King Chunghye's reign, her residence was called as Deokgyeong Mansion (덕경부, 德慶府), but the name was changed into Munye Mansion (문예부, 文睿府) during King Gongmin's reign. Under his command too, she was called as a Grand Consort or Dowager Consort (대비, 大妃) and received her new Honorary name, Royal Queen Mother Sungyeong (숭경왕태후, 崇敬王太后) while stayed in Sungyeong Mansion (숭경부, 崇敬府).

She was in a confrontation with Sin Don and frequently made remarks about the radical reform policies of Gongmin. In particular, when she saw Gongmin killing several servants who were obstacles to the reform policy, she reproached him. When Shin Don was killed, her relationship with her son improved.

After Gongmin's death, her grandson ascended the throne as King U. In 1376, the boy's birth mother, a nobi serf belonging to Shin Don called Ban-Ya, snuck into the queen mother's residence to protest the fact that she was not acknowledged as the king's mother. The queen mother drove the woman out of her residences, and she was later thrown into the Imjin River.

Later life, death and funeral
The Queen Mother lived for another 40 years after her husband's death and later died on 12 February 1380 (6th year reign of King U) at 81 years old. She then received her Posthumous name and buried in Yeongneung tomb (영릉, 令陵). Until 1391, her rites were started to held alongside King Chungjeong's biological mother, Lady Yun under King Gongyang's command. Shortly after her death, her relatives and pro-forces, such as Gyeong Bok-heung (경복흥) were immediately purged.

Family
 Great-Great-Great-Great-Grandfather 
 Hong Gwan (홍관, 洪灌)
 Great-Great-Great-Grandfather 
 Hong Ji-yu (홍지유, 洪至柔)
 Great-Great-Grandfather
 Hong Won-jung (홍원중, 洪源中)
Great-Grandfather
Hong Sa-yun (홍사윤, 洪斯胤)
Great-grandmother: Lady Wang (왕씨, 王氏); daughter of Wang Sa-jong (왕사종, 王嗣宗)
Grandfather 
Hong Jin (홍진, 洪縉; d. 1266) 
Grandmother: Lady Choe (최씨, 崔氏); daughter of Choe Gwang (최광, 崔日+兄; 1208–1229)
Father
Hong Gyu (홍규, 洪奎; 1242–1316)
Aunt: Lady Hong (홍씨, 洪氏)
Uncle: Ryu Seung (류승, 柳陞; 1248–1298)
Aunt: Lady Hong (홍씨, 洪氏)
Uncle: Sin Jin (신진, 申瑱)
Aunt: Lady Hong (홍씨, 洪氏)
Uncle: Choe Mun-rip (최문립, 崔文立) of the Cheorwon Choe clan (철원 최씨, 鐵原 崔氏)
Cousin: Choe Un (최운, 崔雲; 1275–1325)
Aunt: Lady Hong (홍씨, 洪氏)
Uncle: Kim Gae (김개, 金蓋)
Mother
Biological: Grand Lady of Gwangju County of the Gwangju Kim clan (광주군대부인 김씨, 光州郡大夫人 金氏; 1258–1339)
Older brother: Hong Yung (홍융, 洪戒)
Sister-in-law: Lady Ra of the Naju Ra clan (나주 라씨, 夫人 羅氏)
Nephew: Hong Ju (홍주, 洪澍)
Nephew: Hong Eon-bak (홍언박, 洪彦博; 1309–1363)
Nephew: Hong Eon-yu (홍언유, 洪彦猷)
Nephew: Hong Eon-su (홍언수, 洪彦脩)
Older sister: Lady Hong (홍씨, 洪氏)
Brother-in-law: Akutai (아쿠타이, 阿忽台, ᠠᠬᠤᠲᠠᠢ; d. 1307)
Older sister: Lady Hong (홍씨, 洪氏)
Brother-in-law: Jeong Hae (정해, 鄭瑎; 1254–1305)
Older sister: Primary Consort Sunhwa of the Namyang Hong clan (순화원비 홍씨, 順和院妃 洪氏; d. 1306)
Brother-in-law: King Chungseon of Goryeo (고려 충선왕; 1275–1325)
Older sister: Lady Hong (홍씨, 洪氏)
Brother-in-law: Won Chung (원충, 元忠; 1290–1337)
Stepmother: Lady Im of the Jincheon Im clan (진천 임씨, 鎭川 林氏)
Husband: King Chungsuk of Goryeo (고려 충숙왕; 1294–1339)
1st son: King Chunghye of Goryeo (고려 충혜왕; 1315–1344)
2nd son: King Gongmin of Goryeo (고려 공민왕; 1330–1374)

In popular culture
Portrayed by Uhm Yoo-shin in the 2005–2006 MBC TV series Sin Don.
Portrayed by Kim Chung in the 2012-13 SBS TV series The Great Seer.
Portrayed by Lee Duk-hee in the 2014 KBS1 TV series Jeong Do-jeon.

References

External links
 명덕태후 on Doosan Encyclopedia .
Queen Mother Myeongdeok on Encykorea .

1298 births
1380 deaths
Royal consorts of the Goryeo Dynasty
Korean queens consort
13th-century Korean women
14th-century Korean women